Pha Bong is a village and tambon (subdistrict) of Mueang Mae Hong Son District, in Mae Hong Son Province, Thailand. In 2005 it had a population of 9,874 people. The tambon contains 13 villages.

Pha Bong is known for its annual Poy Sang Long Festival, when young boys are ordained to become sang long (novice monks).

References

Tambon of Mae Hong Son province
Populated places in Mae Hong Son province